Following is a list of justices of the New Mexico Supreme Court:

Current justices 

Source: .

Former justices

Territorial judges

References

External links
 New Mexico Reports listing of Supreme Court Justices since statehood

New Mexico
Justices